Myrmica lampra is a species of ant in the genus Myrmica. It is found in Quebec as was named in 1968 by Andre Francoeur. The species is evidently inquiline (it lives in the nest of other Myrmica species).

References 

Myrmica
Insects of Canada
Hymenoptera of North America
Insects described in 1968